Kubhinde may refer to the following places in Nepal:

Kubhinde, Bagmati
Kubhinde, Khotang
Kubhinde, Rapti